Football at the 1936 Summer Olympics was won by Italy. After the introduction of the first FIFA World Cup in 1930 (which had, in itself led to the absence of a football tournament from the 1932 Games programme), competing nations would from now on only be permitted to play their best players if those players were amateur or (where national associations were assisted by interested states to traverse such a rule) where professional players were state-sponsored. However, since amateur players were counted as senior squad players, their results would be still counted as senior side's results until 1992.

Venues

Squads

Medalists

Final tournament

The Italians, winners against the Austrians at the 1934 World Cup now found the Olympic side, with ten changes, a completely different proposition. The Azzurri included players such as Alfredo Foni, Pietro Rava and Ugo Locatelli, who would all play in their World Cup victory in Paris. That they eventually prevailed was due to two incidents: the first when their bespectacled forward Frossi scored, the second when Weingartner, the German referee, was literally restrained from sending off Archille Piccini after fouling two Americans. Italian players held both his arms and covered his mouth in protest. Piccini stayed on the park, Italy won. This was something more than Sweden managed in their tie with Japan the next day in Berlin. Two-nil up within 45 minutes, their loss was recorded by the Swedish commentator, Sven Jerring, calling “Japanese, Japanese, Japanese, Japanese all over” (Japaner, japaner, japaner, överallt japaner) during the final minutes as the Japanese defenders held out to run out as winners 3–2. It marked the first time an Asian side had participated in either the World Cup or Olympic Games football competition and the first time an Asian side emerged victorious. Their neighbours, China, lost 0–2 to Great Britain on the next day. Otherwise there were wins for Peru and the hosts, 9–0 versus Luxembourg.

First round

Quarter-finals

Italy defeated Japan after Pozzo's decision to include Biagi, who scored goals.  The same day at the Poststadion, Berlin before a crowd that included Goebbels, Göring, Hess and Hitler, Germany were knocked out 2–0 by Norway. Goebbels wrote: "The Führer is very excited, I can barely contain myself. A real bath of nerves." Norway went on to draw with Italy in the first round of the 1938 FIFA World Cup. Germany lost 2–0 and Hitler, who had never seen a football match before, and had originally planned to watch the rowing, left early in a huff.

The following day at the Hertha Platz, Austria played Peru. The match was highly contested, and the game went into overtime when the Peruvians drew with the Austrians after being two goals behind. Peru 'scored' five goals during extra time, of which three were disallowed by the referee, and won 4–2. The Austrians demanded a rematch on the grounds that Peruvian fans had stormed the field, and because the field did not meet the requirements for a football game. Austria further claimed that the Peruvian players had manhandled the Austrian players and that spectators, one holding a revolver, had "swarmed down on the field." Peru was notified of this situation, and they attempted to go to the assigned meeting but were delayed by a German parade. In the end, the Peruvian defence was never heard, and the Olympic Committee and FIFA sided with the Austrians. The rematch was scheduled to be replayed behind closed doors on 10 August, and later rescheduled to be taken on 11 August.

As a sign of protest against these actions, which the Peruvians deemed as insulting and discriminatory, the complete Olympic delegations of Peru and Colombia left Germany. Argentina, Chile, Uruguay, and Mexico expressed their solidarity with Peru. Michael Dasso, a member of the Peruvian Olympic Committee, stated: "We've no faith in European athletics. We have come here and found a bunch of merchants." The game was awarded to Austria by default. In Peru, angry crowds protested against the decisions of the Olympic Committee by tearing down an Olympic flag, throwing stones at the German consulate, refusing to load German vessels in the docks of Callao, and listening to inflammatory speeches, which included President Oscar Benavides Larrea's mention of "the crafty Berlin decision." To this day, it is not known with certainty what exactly happened at Germany, but it is popularly believed that Adolf Hitler and the Nazi authorities might have had some involvement in this situation.

In the last of the quarter-finals Poland, assisted by their forward, Hubert Gad, played out a nine-goal party to defeat the British side; at one time they were 5–1 to the better.  The Casual's Bernard Joy scored two as Britain fought back gamely but they ran out of time. Prior to the Games Daniel Pettit received a letter from the Football Association which dealt mostly with the uniform he would wear. As he explained to the academic Rachel Cutler there was a handwritten PS that said: 'As there is a month to go before we leave for Berlin kindly take some exercise.'  Pettit ran around his local park.

Walkover for Austria.

Semi-finals

Bronze medal match

Final (gold medal match)
In the final, Italy overcame Austria in a match refereed by Peco Bauwens. Frossi scored again for the Azzurri. Kainberger equalised for Austria before Frossi got the winner for Italy just as extra time got underway.

Bracket

Goalscorers
7 goals

  Annibale Frossi (Italy)

6 goals

  Teodoro Fernández (Peru)

5 goals

  Arne Brustad (Norway)
  Gerard Wodarz (Poland)

4 goals

  Carlo Biagi (Italy)
  Alejandro Villanueva (Peru)
  Hubert Gad (Poland)

3 goals

  Klement Steinmetz (Austria)
  Wilhelm Simetsreiter (Germany)
  Adolf Urban (Germany)

2 goals

  Karl Kainberger (Austria)
  Adolf Laudon (Austria)
  Josef Gauchel (Germany)
  Bernard Joy (Great Britain)
  Magnar Isaksen (Norway)
  Alf Martinsen (Norway)
  Erik Persson (Sweden)

1 goal

  Franz Mandl (Austria)
  Walter Werginz (Austria)
  Abdel-Karim Sakr (Egypt)
  Ernst Grönlund (Finland)
  William Kanerva (Finland)
  Pentti Larvo (Finland)
  Franz Elbern (Germany)
  Bertram Clements (Great Britain)
  John Dodds (Great Britain)
  Lester Finch (Great Britain)
  Edgar Shearer (Great Britain)
  Giulio Cappelli (Italy)
  Alfonso Negro (Italy)
  Taizo Kawamoto (Japan)
  Akira Matsunaga (Japan)
  Tokutaro Ukon (Japan)
  Reidar Kvammen (Norway)
  Jorge Alcalde (Peru)
  Teodor Peterek (Poland)
  Ryszard Piec (Poland)

References

External links

Olympic Football Tournament Berlin 1936, FIFA.com
RSSSF Archive

 
1936
Olympics
1936
Olympics
1936 Summer Olympics events